Yevgeny Nikolaevich Zhirov (born 10 January 1969) is a Russian footballer. His previous clubs included Zenit Leningrad, Dynamo Leningrad, Zhemchuzhina Sochi, Irtysh Omsk, Meliorator Kyzylorda in Kazakhstan (at that time USSR) and FC Seoul of the South Korean K League, then known as LG Cheetahs.

References

External links 
 

Living people
Russian footballers
FC Zenit Saint Petersburg players
FC Zhemchuzhina Sochi players
Russian Premier League players
Expatriate footballers in South Korea
K League 1 players
FC Seoul players
Russian expatriates in South Korea
1969 births
FC Irtysh Omsk players
Association football midfielders
Association football defenders
FC Dynamo Saint Petersburg players
FC Lukhovitsy players